John W. Blaisdell (1840 - February 4, 1911) was a well-known American stage actor in the second half of the 19th century.

Blaisdell was born in Lowell, Massachusetts in 1840, and made his stage debut at age 17 at the Boston Museum.  Among his performances included being part of the original production of The Black Crook in 1866.

He worked in Chicago for many years and was part of the Hooley company.  He retired from the stage before 1900 and worked for the city of Chicago, where he died on February 4, 1911.

References

External links
 

1840 births
1911 deaths
19th-century American male actors
American male stage actors
Male actors from Massachusetts
Actors from Lowell, Massachusetts